Kabud Kola may refer to:
 Kabud Kola, Amol
 Kabud Kola, Babol